Wilm is a German language surname. It stems from a reduced form of the male given name Wilhelm – and may refer to:
Alfred Wilm (1869–1937), German metallurgist
Clarke Wilm (1976), Canadian former professional ice hockey centre
Ingrid Wilm (1998), Canadian swimmer

References

See also 
Wilms

German-language surnames
Surnames from given names